The Jhanji River (also known as Jaji river or Jhanzi river or Janji river) is a tributary of the Brahmaputra River in the Indian state of Assam. The Jhanji river originates in Mokokchung district of Nagaland. 

The Jhanji  river serves as the western boundary between Jorhat district and Sivasagar district of Assam and joins the Brahmaputra River at Jhanjimukh (Jhanji-mukh where mukh means mouth in Assamese language).

References 

Rivers of Assam
Rivers of India